The Farmers Association for Peace and Development (FAPD) is a trade union of farmers in Cambodia. The union was established in 2007 and has 1,633 members in seven communities. FAPD is affiliated with CLC.

References

Trade unions in Cambodia
2007 establishments in Cambodia
Trade unions established in 2007
Labour relations in Cambodia